This article contains a list of British Indians members of the Indian Civil Service (ICS) in the nineteenth and twentieth centuries.

1855–1899

1900–1947

References

 
Civil servants